The Plant Quarantine Act, originally enacted in 1912 (7 U.S.C. 151 et seq.), gave the Animal and Plant Health Inspection Service (APHIS) authority to regulate the importation and interstate movement of nursery stock and other plants that may carry pests and diseases that are harmful to agriculture. This Act has been superseded by the consolidated APHIS statute, the Plant Protection Act of 2000 (7 U.S.C. 7701 et seq.). This authority is particularly important to the agency’s ability to prevent or limit the spread of harmful invasive species within or to a state or region of the United States.

Provisions of Act
The Plant Quarantine Act was codified as fifteen sections formulating regulations and rules for the importation of nursery stock including annual plants and biennial plants.

Amendments to 1912 Act
U.S. Congressional amendments to the Plant Quarantine Act.

References 

1912 in American law
62nd United States Congress
United States Department of Agriculture
United States federal agriculture legislation